The Captains is a modern Group Sounds rock band that originated out of Sendai, Japan in 2001.  They are heavily influenced by a variety of past Group Sounds artists such as The Mops and The Carnabeats.

Early days
Initially, each member was a leader of other Sendai bands; however Kizuhiko, the leader of The Captains, brought them all together to play Group Sounds as The Captains.  They debuted in 2005 with their single release "Fall In Love With Me."

US Tour
The Captains toured the United States for the first time in September 2007 in support of their debut American release, "Last Group Sounds", a best of album.  The Captains mostly toured alongside The Emeralds and Peelander-Z.

The Captains returned to the United States in the fall of 2008, where they played concerts on the east coast and ultimately returned to Anime Weekend Atlanta as the headlining act, with The Emeralds and Tsu Shi Ma Mi Re as supporting acts.

Line-up
Kizuhiko - Vocalist/Guitarist
Hizashi - Dancer/Guitarist
Ted - Bassist
Yosuke - Drummer

Discography

Albums
First Effort (2002)
Welcome To The New World (2004)
The Rock'n'Roll Frontline (2006)
In A Cage Of Roses (2007)
Last Group Sounds (2007)
Electrik Ninja (2007)
The Rosy Future (2008)
I Love GS (2008)

DVD
Shisshin Tengoku (2007)
Wonderland (2008)

References

External links
 Karaterice Interview with The Captains
 The Captains: Love is Guaranteed - Concert Review, Japan America Society of Greater Philadelphia

Japanese rock music groups
People from Sendai
Musical groups from Miyagi Prefecture